Noiraigue railway station is a railway station in the municipality of Val-de-Travers, in the Swiss canton of Neuchâtel. It is an intermediate stop on the standard gauge Neuchâtel–Pontarlier line of Swiss Federal Railways.

Services
The following services stop at Noiraigue:

References

External links 
 
 

Railway stations in the canton of Neuchâtel
Swiss Federal Railways stations